Stare Bogaczowice  is a village in Wałbrzych County, Lower Silesian Voivodeship, in southwestern Poland. It is the seat of the administrative district (gmina) called Gmina Stare Bogaczowice. Prior to 1945 it was in Germany.

Notable people
Dinardi, stage magician

References

Villages in Wałbrzych County

it:Stare Bogaczowice